Étienne de Carheil (20 November 1633 – 27 July 1726) was a French Jesuit priest who became a missionary to the Iroquois and Huron Indians in the New World.  He served as the chief Jesuit missionary to the Native Americans of the Straits of Mackinac area from 1686 until about 1702.  In this duty, he clashed often with the secular leader of Fort de Buade, the French commandant Antoine de la Mothe Cadillac.

External links 

 Biography at the Dictionary of Canadian Biography Online
 

1633 births
1726 deaths
French Roman Catholic missionaries
17th-century French Jesuits
Roman Catholic missionaries in Canada
Jesuit missionaries in New France